Better Day may refer to:

 Better Day (album), an album by Dolly Parton
 "Better Day" (song), a 1997 rock song by Ocean Colour Scene
 "Better Day", 2019 song by Young Bombs featuring Aloe Blacc that was also included in the 2020 Young Bombs EP The Young Bombs Show

See also
 Better Days (disambiguation)